Broderick Stephen Harvey Sr. (born January 17, 1957) is an American television host, producer, actor, and comedian. He hosts The Steve Harvey Morning Show, Family Feud, Celebrity Family Feud, Family Feud Africa, the arbitration-based court comedy Judge Steve Harvey, and formerly hosted the Miss Universe competition. His accomplishments include seven Daytime Emmy Awards, two Marconi Awards, and fourteen NAACP Image Awards.

Harvey began his career as a stand-up comedian in the early 1980s, and later hosted Showtime at the Apollo and starred in the television sitcom The Steve Harvey Show on The WB. In 2000, he was featured in The Original Kings of Comedy after starring in the Kings of Comedy Tour. His last standup show was in 2012. Additionally, Harvey is the host of both Family Feud and Celebrity Family Feud, holding this role since 2010. He also hosted Little Big Shots, Little Big Shots Forever Young, and Steve Harvey’s Funderdome.

As an author, he has written four books, including his bestseller Act Like a Lady, Think Like a Man, which was published in March 2009. In 2017, Harvey founded Steve Harvey Global, an entertainment company that houses his production company East 112 and various other ventures. He launched an African version of Family Feud and also invested in the HDNet takeover along with Anthem Sports and Entertainment. He and his wife Marjorie are the founders of The Steve and Marjorie Harvey Foundation, a nonprofit organization focused on youth education.

Early life
Steve Harvey was born as Broderick Stephen Harvey on January 17, 1957, in Welch, West Virginia, and is the son of Jesse Harvey, a coal miner, and Eloise Vera. His first name is Broderick, named after actor Broderick Crawford of the TV series Highway Patrol. Harvey had a severe stuttering problem as a child, which he eventually overcame. Harvey's family moved to Cleveland, Ohio, living on East 112th Street, which was renamed Steve Harvey Way in 2015. He graduated from Glenville High School in 1974.

Shortly after high school, he attended Kent State University and West Virginia University and is a member of Omega Psi Phi fraternity but never graduated. While Harvey has talked about overcoming his early life and educational obstacles, he later conceded, "It really threw my life into a downward spiral, and I regret not getting that degree."

Career

Early career and comedy

Harvey has been a boxer, an autoworker, an insurance salesman, a carpet cleaner, and a mail carrier. He first performed stand-up comedy on October 8, 1985, at the Hilarities Comedy Club in Cleveland, Ohio. In the late 1980s, Harvey was homeless for three years. He slept in his 1976 Ford when not performing gigs that provided a hotel, and he showered at gas stations or swimming pool showers. Rich and Becky Liss helped Harvey during this time with a contract for carpet cleaning and credit at a travel agency.

1990–2009; Move to television and film

Harvey was a finalist in the Second Annual Johnnie Walker National Comedy Search performing on April 16, 1990, eventually leading to a long stint as host of It's Showtime at the Apollo, succeeding Mark Curry in that role. His success as a stand-up comedian led to a starring role on the short-lived ABC series Me and the Boys in 1994. He would later star on the WB network show The Steve Harvey Show, which ran from 1996 to 2002. While popular, the show never achieved critical acclaim outside of the African-American community.

In 1997, Harvey continued his work in stand-up comedy, performing on the Kings of Comedy tour along with Cedric the Entertainer, D.L. Hughley, and Bernie Mac. The tour became the highest grossing comedy tour in history, grossing $18 million its first year and $19 million its second. The comedy act would later be put together into a film by Spike Lee called The Original Kings of Comedy. That title was also used as the name of his comedy and variety television show (later renamed Steve Harvey's Big Time Challenge), which aired on The WB network from 2003 until 2005.

Harvey is the host of The Steve Harvey Morning Show, a weekday morning radio program he has hosted since 2000. It was originally syndicated through Radio One Inc. from September 2000 until May 2005. As of 2019, the show is syndicated through the United States.

He appeared in the 2003 movie The Fighting Temptations alongside Cuba Gooding Jr. and Beyoncé Knowles. The same year he played the role of Clarence Johnson in the film Love Don't Cost a Thing. In 2004 he had roles in the films Johnson Family Vacation and You Got Served; and, in 2005, he co-starred in the movie Racing Stripes as the voice of Buzz.

In 2006, Harvey released the stand-up special Steve Harvey: Don't Trip... He Ain't Through with Me Yet directed by Leslie Small. The special was filmed at MegaFest with Harvey not using profanity during the show. Harvey hosted the Disney Dreamers Academy, a teen-focused personal and professional enrichment event that took place January 17–20, 2008, at the Walt Disney World Resort in Lake Buena Vista, Florida.

Harvey released the book Act Like a Lady, Think Like a Man in 2009. The book is about how men think about women and relationships. Based on the book, the 2012 film Think Like a Man is an ensemble romantic comedy depicting characters taking advice on dating from the book. The hardcover version spent 64 weeks on The New York Times best-seller list, 23 of those weeks at No. 1.

2010–2016; Family Feud and other ventures

Harvey began hosting Family Feud in September 2010. The show has seen improved ratings under Harvey, and he has surpassed every previous Feud host to date in length of consecutive tenures. Harvey also hosts Celebrity Family Feud, where celebrities compete for a chance to donate up to $25,000 to their favorite charity. The show airs during the summer on ABC.

In August 2011, on his radio show, Harvey called Cornel West and Tavis Smiley "Uncle Toms" because of their criticism of President Barack Obama. Harvey later apologized for using the phrase but maintained his criticism of West and Smiley.

On August 2, 2012, Harvey performed his final stand-up act at the MGM Grand in Las Vegas, ending a 27-year career as a stand-up comedian. The two-hour performance was broadcast live on pay-per-view.  The same year, Harvey debuted a self-titled syndicated talk show produced by Endemol and distributed by NBCUniversal Television Distribution at the NBC Tower in Chicago.

In 2013, Harvey became the first double host nominated for a Daytime Emmy Award, receiving nominations for both Outstanding Talk Show Host and Outstanding Game Show Host. He was also honored with a star on the Hollywood Walk of Fame. The following year, Harvey launched a new dating website called Delightful. It is a joint venture with IAC with Harvey supplying articles and videos for the site.

In December 2015, Harvey hosted the Miss Universe 2015 pageant in Las Vegas. Upon announcing the final results, he mistakenly named the first runner-up, Miss Colombia (Ariadna Gutiérrez) as the winner. A few minutes after she was crowned, Harvey announced that he had read the results incorrectly and that Miss Philippines (Pia Wurtzbach) was the new Miss Universe. He apologized to Wurtzbach outside the venue and later tweeted an apology to both contestants. Harvey also hosted the Miss Universe 2016 pageant in the Philippines on January 30, 2017, telling the Miss Universe Organization that he wanted to personally apologize to the Filipinos for the incident that occurred in the last Miss Universe pageant he hosted. He returned as host for the Miss Universe 2017 pageant in Las Vegas on November 26, 2017, the Miss Universe 2018 pageant in Thailand on December 17, 2018, the Miss Universe 2019 pageant on December 8, 2019 in Atlanta, Georgia, and the Miss Universe 2021 pageant in Israel on December 13, 2021.

In January 2016, Harvey gave a motivational speech to audience members after the taping of an episode of Family Feud. The theme of the speech was for people to embrace the skills they were born with. He references embracing the gifts with jumping from a cliff and relying on the parachute (those gifts) to help you. The speech was the motivation for the book Leap: Take the Leap of Faith to Achieve Your Life of Abundance, published by Harvey in 2016.

In October 2016, it was announced that Harvey would host two revival specials of Showtime at the Apollo for Fox. In November 2016, the Steve Harvey talk show was cancelled, and it was announced that Harvey had reached a deal with IMG to produce a new syndicated talk show in Los Angeles with NBCUniversal. The new series, Steve, premiered in September 2017, and was described as having more of a celebrity- and comedy-oriented format with a larger amount of creative control held by Harvey, as opposed to the previous program's larger focus on human interest subjects. To facilitate the new series, production of Harvey's radio show and Family Feud were relocated to L.A.

Harvey is the co-creator of Little Big Shots, a series launched in 2016; executive producers are Harvey and Ellen DeGeneres. The series features children demonstrating talents and engaging in conversation with Harvey. He hosted the show until 2019.

2017–present; Steve Harvey Global

Harvey united all of his businesses under Steve Harvey Global (SHG) in 2017. Brands under SHG include East One Twelve, Harvey's in-house production company that is used to develop digital content, films, and television. The company also owns the rights for international versions of Family Feud, of which an African version of the show was announced to begin in 2020. He also launched the Sand and Soul Festival in 2017. The event has been held yearly and features live music, comedy, and a question and answers session with Harvey and his wife Marjorie. He also launched Harvey Events, a special events company led by his daughter Morgan Hawthorne and son-in-law Kareem Hawthorne. It has produced events such as the FroRibbean Fest in Atlanta in 2018.

In 2017, Harvey began hosting a New Year's Eve special from Times Square for Fox (which, like his talk show, would be produced in partnership with IMG). Two days before the broadcast, Harvey was ordained in the state of New York so he could officiate an on-air wedding between Keven Undergaro and Maria Menounos during the special. The special was Fox's most-watched New Year's Eve broadcast to date.

In January 2017, Steve Harvey made jokes on Steve Harvey about Asian men, ridiculing the idea that any white or black woman would want to date one. "Excuse me, do you like Asian men?" he said, "No, thank you." He went on to add, "I don't even like Chinese food." The remarks were met with criticism from Asian Americans, including New York politicians and Fresh Off the Boat author Eddie Huang. For instance, Huang remarked about Harvey's hypocrisy in speaking about issues facing the black community while denigrating Asians. Harvey apologized on his talk show and Twitter, saying: "I offer my humblest apology for offending anyone, particularly those in the Asian community. … It was not my intention, and the humor was not meant with any malice or disrespect whatsoever." However, he also earlier said, "I ain't been laughing that much over the past few days. They're kinda beating me up on the internet right now for no reason. But, you know, that's life, ain't it?"

In response to a caller from Flint, Michigan, who insulted the Cleveland Cavaliers after their loss to the Golden State Warriors, Harvey, a Cavaliers fan, told the caller to "go have yourself a nice glass of brown water!" in reference to the city's water crisis. The joke was criticized by, among others, Amariyanna Copeny and Flint Mayor Karen Weaver, who demanded a public apology. Harvey responded by saying, "The caller and I were talking trash about our teams and cities. Simply trash talking about sports. I made a joke directed at him, as he is from Flint, a city for which I have great affection and respect. So much so that I devoted a full hour on my daytime talk show to raising awareness for the Flint water crisis. … The caller laughed, as my joke was taken in the context it was offered."

At the end of 2018, it was announced that Harvey would be the host of the 8th annual NFL Honors. According to Harvey, he had wanted to host the honors for a while, going as far as to say in his opening monologue "What took y'all so long to ask me to host the show?" He returned to host the 9th annual show the following season.

In 2019, Harvey announced the launch of a learning hub called Vault. He also spoke at the first Vault conference held in Los Angeles. He also invested in the takeover of HDNet along with Anthem Sports & Entertainment.

In January 2022, Harvey began hosting the arbitration-based court comedy Judge Steve Harvey on ABC.

On International Day of Happiness 2022, Harvey (on behalf of the United States and the Vatican pavilions) held a talk in Dubai during Expo 2020 to discuss about the relations between happiness and religion.

Philanthropy

Harvey is the founder of the Steve & Marjorie Harvey Foundation, a philanthropic organization that provides youth outreach services. The foundation hosts a yearly camp for fatherless children and also partnered with Kent State University to provide scholarships to the school. Harvey is also a partner with Walt Disney World Resort and Essence for the Disney Dreamers Academy, a yearly workshop at Walt Disney World for 100 students.

During the 2022 Halloween Thriller Night hosted by the Heal Los Angeles Foundation, Harvey and Chris Tucker were honored and received the inaugural "Man in The Mirror" Award. The award is given to influential individuals using their platforms for good. Harvey accepted the award that was presented by Prince Jackson, son of Michael Jackson.

Personal life
Harvey has been married three times and has seven children (four biological children and three stepchildren). From his first marriage, to Marcia Harvey, he has two daughters (twins Brandi and Karli) and one son (Broderick Harvey Jr.). From his second marriage, to Mary Shackelford, Harvey has another son named Wynton. The couple divorced in November 2005. In 2011, Collin County, Texas-based 199th District Court Judge Robert Dry expressed concern about Mary Harvey spreading false information about the divorce, with the judge suggesting that she had not been left materially destitute.

In June 2007, Harvey married Marjorie Bridges, who he says is responsible for making him a better man and changing his life. Marjorie Harvey is mother to three children (Morgan, Jason, and Lori), all of whom Steve adopted. Steve and Marjorie have five grandchildren: three through Jason's marriage to his wife Amanda, one through Morgan's marriage to her husband Kareem, and one through Karli's marriage to husband Ben. Through 2017, Harvey and his family divided their time between Atlanta, where his radio show was broadcast and Family Feud was recorded, and Chicago, where he hosted his talk show for NBCUniversal from the company's Chicago studios, although he would host his radio show there as well. In 2018, Harvey moved his talk show, radio show, and Family Feud to Los Angeles.

In January 2017, Harvey was met with criticism for his decision to meet with then-President-elect Donald Trump. He defended his decision, citing that it would help spark positive changes.

Harvey is a Christian and has attributed his success to his faith in God. He reports that he has followed a vegan diet for health reasons and has presented the rationale for his diet on his TV program.

Written works

 2009, Act Like a Lady, Think Like a Man
 2010, Straight Talk, No Chaser
 2014, Act Like a Success
 2016, Jump, Take the Leap of Faith to Achieve Your Life of Abundance

Filmography

Television

Film

Internet streaming

Awards and honors

Emmy Awards
 2014: Daytime Emmy Award for Outstanding Game Show Host – Family Feud
 2014: Daytime Emmy Award for Daytime Emmy Award for Outstanding Talk Show Informative (as host/executive producer of Steve Harvey)
 2015: Daytime Emmy Award for Outstanding Talk Show Informative (as host/executive producer of Steve Harvey)
 2017: Daytime Emmy Award for Outstanding Informative Talk Show Host – Steve Harvey
 2017: Daytime Emmy Award for Outstanding Game Show Host – Family Feud
 2018: Daytime Emmy Award for Outstanding Informative Talk Show Host – Steve
 2022: Daytime Emmy Award for Outstanding Game Show Host – Family Feud

NAACP Image Awards
 Four-time winner: Outstanding Actor in a Comedy Series (1999, 2000, 2001, 2002)
 Three-time winner: Outstanding Comedy Series (as executive producer/star of The Steve Harvey Show – 2000, 2001, 2002)
 2001: Entertainer of the Year
 Three-time winner: Outstanding News/Talk/Info Series (as executive producer/host of Steve Harvey – 2014, 2015, 2017)
 2015: Outstanding Host – Talk/Reality/Variety/News/Information
 2016: Outstanding Host – Talk/Reality/Variety/News/Information
 2016: Outstanding Variety Series/Special (as host of Family Feud)

Radio
 2007: Syndicated Personality/Show of the Year – Radio & Records magazine
 2013: Marconi Award winner – Network/Syndicated Personality of the Year
 2015: Marconi Award winner – Network/Syndicated Personality of the Year

Television
 2013: Favorite New Talk Show Host – 39th People's Choice Awards

Organizational
 2011: BET Humanitarian Award – 2011 BET Awards

Halls of Fame
 2013: Star on the Hollywood Walk of Fame
 2014: NAB Broadcasting Hall of Fame inductee (Radio)

State/local
 2015: East 112th Street in Cleveland renamed Steve Harvey Way

Honorary degrees
 2016: Honorary Doctorate Degree Received at Alabama State University in Montgomery, Alabama

References

External links

 
 
 The Steve & Marjorie Harvey Foundation

1957 births
Living people
20th-century American comedians
20th-century American male actors
20th-century American writers
20th-century Christians
21st-century American comedians
21st-century American male actors
21st-century American writers
21st-century Christians
African-American Christians
American Christians
African-American game show hosts
African-American male actors
African-American male comedians
American male comedians
African-American radio personalities
African-American stand-up comedians
American stand-up comedians
African-American television personalities
African-American television producers
Television producers from California
African-American television talk show hosts
American television talk show hosts
African-American writers
American male film actors
American male television actors
Beauty pageant hosts
Comedians from Ohio
Critics of atheism
Daytime Emmy Award for Outstanding Game Show Host winners
Glenville High School alumni
Island Records artists
Kent State University alumni
Male actors from West Virginia
People from Welch, West Virginia
Radio personalities from Atlanta
Radio personalities from Chicago
Radio personalities from Dallas
Radio personalities from Los Angeles
Radio personalities from West Virginia
Television personalities from Cleveland
Television personalities from West Virginia
West Virginia University alumni
Writers from West Virginia
Comedians from West Virginia
20th-century American male writers
Television producers from West Virginia
Television producers from Illinois
Television producers from Texas
Film producers from California
Film producers from Illinois
Film producers from Texas
Film producers from Ohio
Comedians from California
Comedians from Illinois